Ruhi Naze (last name also spelled Naj, Naaj, Naz or Naaz) is a Nepali politician and a member of the House of Representatives of the federal parliament of Nepal. She was elected under the proportional representation system from Federal Socialist Forum, Nepal.

References

Living people
Place of birth missing (living people)
21st-century Nepalese politicians
21st-century Nepalese women
Nepal MPs 2017–2022
Madhesi Jana Adhikar Forum, Nepal politicians
People's Socialist Party, Nepal politicians
1971 births